The 2003 Cal Poly Mustangs football team represented California Polytechnic State University during the 2003 NCAA Division I-AA football season.

2003 was the last year Cal Poly competed as an NCAA Division I-AA independent. In 2004 they would become a charter member of the new Great West Football Conference.  The 2003 Mustangs were led by third-year head coach Rich Ellerson and played home games at Mustang Stadium in San Luis Obispo, California. The team finished the season with a record of three wins and eight losses (7–4). Overall, the team outscored its opponents 316–241 for the season.

Schedule

Team players in the NFL
No Cal Poly Mustang players were selected in the 2004 NFL Draft.

The following finished their college career in 2003, were not drafted, but played in the NFL.

Notes

References

Cal Poly
Cal Poly Mustangs football seasons
Cal Poly Mustangs football